Płaszów is a suburb of Kraków, Poland, now part of Podgórze district. Formerly a separate village, it became a part of the Greater Kraków in 1911 under the Austrian Partition of Poland as the 21st cadastral district of the city. During World War II, it was the location of Kraków-Płaszów concentration camp for Jews deported from the Kraków Ghetto, as well as other prisoners from across occupied Poland.

See also 
 Auschwitz concentration camp
 Kraków-Płaszów concentration camp

References 

 Atlas Miasta Krakowa (collective work of Institute of Geography of the Jagiellonian University), Polskie Przedsiębiorstwo Wydawnictw Kartograficznych, 1988, .

External links 
 

Districts of Kraków
Holocaust locations in Poland